Ernest Welvaert (1880 – 1946) was a Belgian painter.

Life and work
He was born in Lokeren, East Flanders, Belgium, in 1880. He studied at the Antwerp National Higher Institute of Fine Arts. Among his fellow students there were Joe English, Isidoor Opsomer, and Maurice Sys. He was influenced by Emile Claus and Theodoor Verstraete. During his career his style changed from Impressionism to Expressionism.

He married and then settled in the forest of Daknam. His paintings mostly depict the landscape and the people of Waasland.

In 1921 the family moved to Mechelen, and then to Uccle, where Welvaert died in 1946. In the latter part of his career his paintings' colors became gloomier. His last paintings are portraits and Brabant landscapes.

Gallery

Sources

References

1880 births
1946 deaths
19th-century Belgian painters
19th-century Belgian male artists
20th-century Belgian painters
Belgian Impressionist painters
Belgian Expressionist painters
People from Lokeren
20th-century Belgian male artists